The 2008 Tour de las Américas was the eighth season of the Tour de las Américas, the main professional golf tour in Latin America since it was established in 2000.

The Tour de las Américas continued its close association with the European Tour, with three events being co-sanctioned by the Challenge Tour, Europe's official development tour. It also began an association with the Canadian Tour, co-sanctioning three events.

Schedule
The following table lists official events during the 2008 season.

Order of Merit
The Order of Merit was based on prize money won during the season, calculated in U.S. dollars.

Notes

References

External links
Official site

Tour de las Américas
Tour de las Americas